Kananook railway station is located on the Frankston line in Victoria, Australia. It serves the south-eastern Melbourne suburb of Seaford, and it opened on 25 August 1975.

History

Kananook station opened on 25 August 1975, and was named after the nearby Kananook Creek. To accommodate the station and allow construction, in March 1974, the Up and Down lines were slewed. At the same time, the current Klauer Street overpass, located at the Up end of the station, was provided, replacing the Wells Road level crossing.

In 1991, parts of the station were upgraded, including the pedestrian overpass and car park.

The station was featured in the first episode of the television series Sensing Murder, which aired on Network Ten in September 2004.

In 2007, upgrades to the station occurred as part of the EastLink road project, linking Ringwood to Frankston. The original station building was demolished and replaced with a shelter, and a freeway noise protection wall was constructed. The former station building was a semi large fibro building at the centre of the station, with two semi-enclosed waiting areas on the platforms and a disused booking office near the entrance of the station.

To the east of the station is the access track for the Kananook Train Storage Facility, which is located north of the station. In May 2020, the stabling yard opened.

Platforms and services

Kananook has one island platform with two faces. It is serviced by Metro Trains' Frankston line services.

Platform 1:
  all stations and limited express services to Flinders Street, Werribee and Williamstown

Platform 2:
  all stations services to Frankston

Transport links

Kinetic Melbourne operates one SmartBus route via Kananook station, under contract to Public Transport Victoria:
  : Frankston station – Melbourne Airport

Ventura Bus Lines operates three routes via Kananook station, under contract to Public Transport Victoria:
 : to Carrum Downs
 : Frankston station – Belvedere Park Primary School (Seaford)
 : Frankston station – Carrum Downs

References

External links

 Melway map at street-directory.com.au

Railway stations in Melbourne
Railway stations in Australia opened in 1975
Railway stations in the City of Frankston